Al Araby is a general television network launched in January 2015. It broadcasts a variety of programs and news shows in Arabic, covering society, politics, entertainment and culture. The network has bureaus in several Arab and Western capitals, through 11 bureaus in the Middle East and worldwide. The channel was planned as a counterweight to Al Jazeera, which was viewed by some as having a pro-Muslim Brotherhood bias.

Formerly based in London, Al Araby announced it would move its headquarters to Qatar in 2021. The move was heavily advertised on social media in the weeks leading up to the eventual shift of operations to Lusail planned city on 30 August 2022.

Mission statement

The network says in its mission statement that it aims to "fulfil the Arab citizen's desire for content that engages them and capture the way they perceive themselves, their world and the future". Al Araby TV is considered a platform for the Arab youth, and it aspires to be the voice of its young Arab viewers.

Al Araby TV is part of the Qatar-based Fadaat Media network, of which The New Arab is also a member.

Al Araby aims to impact on Arab citizens, their views of themselves, the world and the future, and seeks to be the voice of Arab viewers everywhere.

Organisation and staff

Al Araby TV is already one of the largest TV networks in the region, TV production facilities in London - and has been built to compete with the Arab world's largest and most popular broadcasters. It is estimated that Alaraby TV is home to more than 400 media staff.

Notable programs

Remix series 
In 2016, Hamza Namira launched the TV series Remix (in ) on Al Araby TV. The popular series filmed in a number of countries featured the relevance of the songs chosen from the various folkloric repertoire of a number of Arab countries, and the process through Namira's collaborations with a number of artists and musical groups in remixing. Each 30-minute episode would end with a special collaborative performance of the songs by Namira and an accompanying musical band or vocalists in a contemporary fashion. With the immense popularity of the initial 12-episode series, a new series was announced on the same channel that aired in 2017 and a further third series in 2018.

Tarab with Marwan Khoury 
Tarab with Marwan Khoury (in ) airs every Friday on Al Araby, where the host Marwan Khoury, Lebanese singer, writer, composer and music arranger, aims through this show to acquaint the young viewers of the channel with the Arab classics, and hosts in his show popular singers to relive the golden age of Arabic music.

Joe Show 
Joe Show (in ) is a popular talk show and political satire television program hosted by Egyptian comedian Youssef Hussien and it airs each Thursday on Al Araby TV. The show mainly tackles events and news from the Arab world in a comic and cynical manner. The television program sheds light on the media biases in the Arab world, and striking paradoxes in the rhetoric of politicians and their conflicting stances and opinions; and reintroduces them comically. The show consists of four segments; the first two parts cover current events in Egypt, the last two parts looks at the rest of the Arab world.

Zool Cafe 
Zool Cafe joined Alaraby TV in December 2019. The show was one of the biggest Sudanese shows on YouTube. It tackles social and political issues in Sudan, and is currently one of the most popular shows on Alaraby TV's social media platforms.

Others 
 New Morning
 Al Araby Today
 Behind the news
 The Last

See also 

 Al-Araby Al-Jadeed
 List of Arabic-language television channels
 Media of Qatar
 Al Jazeera

References

External links 
 
 
 

Television networks in Qatar